The 2017 Polish Super Cup was held on 7 July 2017 between the 2016–17 Ekstraklasa winners Legia Warsaw and the 2016–17 Polish Cup winners Arka Gdynia.

Match details

See also
2016–17 Ekstraklasa
2016–17 Polish Cup

References

Super Cup
Polish Super Cup
Polish Super Cup
Sports competitions in Warsaw
Polish Super Cup 2017